Rehabilitation hospitals, also referred to as inpatient rehabilitation hospitals, are devoted to the rehabilitation of patients with various neurological, musculoskeletal, orthopedic, and other medical conditions following stabilization of their acute medical issues. The industry is largely made up by independent hospitals that operate these facilities within acute care hospitals. There are also inpatient rehabilitation hospitals that offer this service in a hospital-like setting, but separate from acute care facilities. Most inpatient rehabilitation facilities are located within hospitals.

The objective of rehabilitation is to cure a patient completely. However, exact goals vary for each person. For instance, someone with a problem in their lungs might get pulmonary rehabilitation so that their breathing becomes better.

On the other hand, someone with a spine injury may need physical therapy and rehab to help restrict more damage from happening to their backs.

Kinds of therapy 
When you obtain rehabilitation services at a facility, there is often a team of various healthcare providers who will work with you to determine your treatment plan and goals. Though the types of therapy offered at rehabilitation facilities vary, below are some of the most common ones:

 Cognitive rehabilitation therapy to help you relearn skills such as thinking, remembering, learning, organizing, etc.
 Mental health counseling
 Assistive devices including tools and devices to enable people with disabilities in performing daily activities
 Speech therapy to assist you in speaking, listening, understanding, writing, and swallowing
 Nutritional counseling
 Pain treatment
 Occupational therapy to perform daily activities smoothly
 Music therapy to express your thoughts and feelings and build social networks
 Recreational therapy to enhance your emotional well-being through games, painting, and other forms of training
 Vocational rehabilitation for developing skills to pursue your education or working at an organization

History
Rehabilitation hospitals were created to meet a perceived need for facilities which were less costly on a per diem basis than general hospitals but which provided a higher level of professional therapies such as speech therapy, occupational therapy, and physical therapy than can be obtained in a "skilled nursing care" facility.  In the United States, rehabilitation hospitals are designed to meet the requirements imposed upon them by the Medicare administration, and to bill at the rates allowed by Medicare for such a facility.  Medicare allows a lifetime total of 100 days' stay in a rehabilitation hospital per person.  A rehabilitation hospital can only be accessed following a stay as an inpatient in a general hospital which has lasted for a certain number of days.  The general hospital will evaluate the patient to determine if the patient will benefit from rehabilitation services.  A positive determination will be made if the patient is deemed to require a certain level of therapies.  If a positive determination is made, a report concerning the patient's needs will be sent to the rehabilitation hospital, which has the discretion to admit or not admit the patient.  If the patient is transferred to the rehabilitation hospital, his/her medical records and a recommended treatment plan will be transmitted with the patient.  The treatment plan will include daily therapies except on weekends.  Some rehabilitation hospitals have physicians on staff; others do not.

Hospitals
The following are some rehabilitation hospitals in Wikipedia:
Helen Hayes Hospital, West Haverstraw, New York
Children's Specialized Hospital (Age 0-21), New Brunswick, New Jersey
Burke Rehabilitation Hospital, White Plains, New York
Magee Rehabilitation Hospital, Philadelphia, Pennsylvania
Mary Free Bed Rehabilitation Hospital, Grand Rapids, Michigan
MedStar National Rehabilitation Hospital, Washington, D.C.
MossRehab
Leamington Spa Hospital, Warwickshire, England
St John of God Frankston Rehabilitation Hospital, Frankston, Victoria, Australia
Sunnaas Rehabilitation Hospital, Nesodden, Norway
University of Maryland Rehabilitation & Orthopaedic Institute, Baltimore, Maryland
Walton Rehabilitation Hospital, Augusta, Georgia

See also
Physical medicine and rehabilitation

References

Hospital departments
Rehabilitation hospitals